Ramamurti Shankar (born April 28, 1947) is the Josiah Willard Gibbs professor of Physics at Yale University, in New Haven, Connecticut.

Education 
He received his B. Tech in electrical engineering from the Indian Institute of Technology in Madras and his Ph.D. in theoretical particle physics from the University of California, Berkeley (1974).

Career 
His research is in theoretical condensed matter physics, although he is also known for his earlier work in theoretical particle physics. In 2009, Shankar was awarded the Julius Edgar Lilienfeld Prize from the American Physical Society for "innovative applications of field theoretic techniques to quantum condensed matter systems". After three years at the Harvard Society of Fellows, he joined the Yale physics department, which he chaired between 2001-2007. He is a fellow of the American Academy of Arts and Sciences. He is the second Indian after S. Chandrasekhar to be a member of Harvard Society of Fellows.
His Youtube lectures have been viewed by over 20 million people. In 2004 he was appointed the John Randolph Huffman Professor of Physics and in 2019 the Josiah Willard Gibbs Professor of Physics.

Selected publications
Principles of Quantum Mechanics, Plenum, 1994.
Basic Training in Mathematics, Plenum, 1995.
Fundamentals of Physics, Yale Press, 2014.
Fundamentals of Physics II, Yale Press, 2016.
Quantum Field Theory and Condensed Matter: An Introduction, Cambridge University Press, 2017.

References

External links
 Ramamurti Shankar webpage at Yale University
 Fundamentals of Physics Lectures on YouTube.

1947 births
Living people
University of California, Berkeley alumni
21st-century American physicists
Yale University faculty
20th-century Indian physicists
IIT Madras alumni
Indian condensed matter physicists
Tamil scientists
Scientists from Tamil Nadu
Fellows of the American Physical Society
Fellows of the American Academy of Arts and Sciences